Netherlands competed at the 2014 Summer Youth Olympics, in Nanjing, China from 16 August to 28 August 2014.

Archery

Netherlands qualified a male archer from its performance at the 2013 World Archery Youth Championships.

Individual

Team

Badminton

Netherlands qualified two athletes based on the 2 May 2014 BWF Junior World Rankings.

Singles

Doubles

Basketball

Netherlands qualified a girls' team based on the 1 June 2014 FIBA 3x3 National Federation Rankings.

Skills Competition

Girls' Tournament

Roster
 Esther Fokke
 Janis Janis Ndiba
 Fleur Kuijt
 Charlotte van Kleef

Group Stage

Knockout Stage

Cycling

Netherlands qualified a boys' and girls' team based on its ranking issued by the UCI.

Team

Mixed Relay

Equestrian

Netherlands qualified a rider.

Field Hockey

Netherlands qualified a girls' team based on its performance at the 2013 Youth European Championship.

Girls' Tournament

Roster

 Karlijn Adank
 Michelle Fillet
 Kyra Fortuin
 Maxime Kerstholt
 Frederique Matla
 Elin van Erk
 Marijn Veen
 Carmen Wijsman
 Ginella Zerbo

Group Stage

Quarterfinal

Semifinal

Gold medal match

Golf

Netherlands qualified one team of two athletes based on the 8 June 2014 IGF Combined World Amateur Golf Rankings.

Individual

Team

Gymnastics

Artistic Gymnastics

Netherlands qualified one athlete based on its performance at the 2014 European WAG Championships.

Girls

Judo

Netherlands qualified two athletes based on its performance at the 2013 Cadet World Judo Championships.

Individual

Team

Sailing

Netherlands qualified one boat based on its performance at the 2013 World Byte CII Championships. Later Netherlands qualified one boat based on its performance at the Byte CII European Continental Qualifiers and two boats from the Techno 293 European Continental Qualifiers.

Swimming

Netherlands qualified seven swimmers.

Boys

Girls

Mixed

Taekwondo

Netherlands qualified three athletes based on its performance at the Taekwondo Qualification Tournament.

Boys

Triathlon

Netherlands qualified one athlete based on its performance at the 2014 European Youth Olympic Games Qualifier.

Individual

Relay

References

2014 in Dutch sport
Nations at the 2014 Summer Youth Olympics
Netherlands at the Youth Olympics